Quadrama is an album by saxophonist and composer Gil Mellé recorded in 1957 and released on the Prestige label.

Reception

Allmusic awarded the album 2 stars.

Track listing 
All compositions by Gil Mellé except as indicated
 "Rush Hour in Hong Kong" - 6:49
 "Jacqueline" - 5:16  
 "It Don't Mean a Thing (If It Ain't Got That Swing)" (Duke Ellington, Irving Mills) - 6:15
 "In a Sentimental Mood" (Ellington, Mills, Manny Kurtz) - 4:45
 "Walter Ego" - 3:20 
 "Full House" - 5:15     
 "Quadrama" - 3:35

Personnel 
Gil Mellé - baritone saxophone 
Joe Cinderella - guitar
George Duvivier - bass
Shadow Wilson - drums

Production
Bob Weinstock - supervisor
Rudy Van Gelder - engineer

References 

Gil Mellé albums
1957 albums
Prestige Records albums
Albums produced by Bob Weinstock
Albums recorded at Van Gelder Studio